Canta District is one of seven districts of the province Canta in Peru.

See also 
 Tarapu

References